This is a list of hip-hop artists that were born or raised in Atlanta, Georgia and the surrounding suburban areas. Many of these artists continue to be a part of the Atlanta hip hop scene.

Atlanta hip hop artists

112
21 Savage
2 Chainz
6LACK
Alex Faith
Akon
André 3000
Anthony Preston
Arrested Development
Audio (B5)
Bankroll Fresh
Bankroll Mafia
Baby D
Big Boi
Big Gipp
Big Kuntry King
Big Rube
Blood Raw
Bobby Creekwater
Bone Crusher
Boyz n da Hood
Bubba Sparxxx
Camoflauge
Cash Out
Cee Lo Green 
Cherish
Childish Gambino
Christopher Massey
Clan Destined
Cool Breeze
Count Bass D
Crime Mob
Cyber Sapp
Cyhi the Prynce
Da BackWudz
Daron Jones
Deante' Hitchcock
Dear Jayne
Dem Franchize Boyz
Diamond
Digital Nas
DJ Burn One
DJ Felli Fel
DJ Lord
DJ Spinz
DJ Toomp
Dolla
Don Vito
Donnis
Drumma Boy
Dun Deal
Dungeon Family
EarthGang
Fabo
Fast Life Yungstaz
Field Mob
Freak Nasty
Future
Ghetto Mafia
Goodie Mob
Gorilla Zoe
Gucci Mane
Gunna
Hard Boyz
Hoodrich Pablo Juan
I-20
ILoveMakonnen
India.Arie
Jagged Edge
Jamia Simone Nash
Jamie Grace
Janelle Monáe
Jarren Benton
Jazze Pha
Jermaine Dupri
JID
Jim Crow
K Camp
Kalenna Harper
Kandi Burruss
Kanye West
Kap G
Keisha Jackson
Kelly Rowland
K.E. on the Track
Keri Hilson
Khujo
Killer Mike
Kilo Ali
Kris Kross
Kyle Massey
Lecrae
Latto
Lil Baby
Lil Gotit
Lil Jon
Lil Keed
Lil Nas X
Lil Ru
Lil Scrappy
Lil Yachty
Lil Zane
Lisa Lopes
London on da Track
Lumberjacks
Ludacris
MadeinTYO
Major Damage
Manchild
Mario Judah
MattyB
Migos
Mike Will Made It
Money Man
Mr. Collipark (DJ Smurf)
Mullage
Nivea
Nitti
Offset
OG Maco
OMG Girlz
Organized Noize
Outkast
Pastor Troy
Pill
Playboi Carti
Playaz Circle
Polow da Don
P$C
Purple Ribbon All-Stars
Quavo
Rasheeda
Rich Kidz
RichGirl
Rich Homie Quan
Rich the Kid
Rittz
Rocko
Rome Fortune
Roscoe Dash
Rubi Rose
Russ
SahBabii
Scotty ATL
Scrilla
Sevyn Streeter
Shawty Lo
Shop Boyz
Silentó
Silk
Sleepy Brown
Slim
SoFaygo
Southside
Soulja Boy
Soundz
Speech
Spillage Village
Stat Quo
Supreeme
Takeoff
Taurus
T'Melle
The Jet Age of Tomorrow
The Mr. Move
The Platinum Brothers
The Redland
T.I.
TLC
T-Mo
Travis Porter
Trillville
Trinidad James
Trouble
Unk
USDA
Usher
V.I.C.
Waka Flocka Flame
WDNG Crshrs
We Are Toonz
Xscape
Y'all So Stupid
YFN Lucci
Ying Yang Twins
YC 
YoungBloodZ
Young Dro
Young Scooter
Young Thug
Young Nudy
Jeezy
Yung Joc
Yung L.A.
Yung Wun
Zack Fox
Zaytoven

See also

 List of hip hop musicians
 List of people from Atlanta

References

 Atlanta
Hip hop
Atlanta
Musicians

Lists of American musicians